Irish Ridge is a ridge located in Central New York Region of New York located in the Town of Verona in Oneida County, northwest of Oneida.

References

Mountains of Oneida County, New York
Mountains of New York (state)